Santissima Trinità dei Pellegrini may refer to one of three churches:
Santissima Trinità dei Pellegrini, Brescia
Santissima Trinità dei Pellegrini, Naples
Santissima Trinità dei Pellegrini, Rome